"It's Up to You Petula" is a song by English band Edison Lighthouse. It was released as a non-album single, but was included on their 1971 debut release, Already.

The single became a modest international hit as a follow-up to the group's major hit during the previous year, "Love Grows (Where My Rosemary Goes)". It reached number 49 in the UK and number 18 in New Zealand. It was a minor hit in the United States and Canada.

Chart performance

References

External links
 Lyrics of this song
 

1971 singles
Edison Lighthouse songs
1970 songs
Bell Records singles
Songs written by Geoff Morrow